The Calgary Downtown District Energy Centre is a thermal district energy system under development by Calgary-based ENMAX with funding support from provincial and federal government programs. The first central thermal plant to supply the system is under construction at the corner of 4th Street and 9th Avenue SE in Calgary, Alberta, Canada. Although the groundbreaking ceremony for the project took place in early fall of 2008, major construction activities did not commence until late November. The first phase of the system is expected to be operational in 2009, supplying thermal energy to meet the space and domestic hot water heating needs of selected new and existing buildings in Calgary's downtown.

The Centre will be owned by a subsidiary of ENMAX, which will develop and operate the facility and its related thermal distribution system.

References

https://web.archive.org/web/20081202104350/http://www.enmax.com/Corporation/Media+Room/Current+News+Releases/53DE.htm
http://www.newswire.ca/en/releases/archive/September2008/11/c3790.html

History of Calgary
Energy in Alberta